Events in the year 1982 in Argentina.

Incumbents
 President: 
Leopoldo Galtieri (until 18 June)
Alfredo Oscar Saint Jean (18 June–1 July)
Reynaldo Bignone (from 1 July)

Events

April 
2 April: The Falklands War began with the 1982 invasion of the Falkland Islands. 
3 April: Invasion of South Georgia
25 April: Operation Paraquet

May 
14–15 May: Raid on Pebble Island
21–23 May: Operation Sutton
21–25 May: Battle of San Carlos
23 May: Battle of Seal Cove
28–29 May: Battle of Goose Green
29 May–11 June: Battle of Mount Kent
31 May: Skirmish at Top Malo House

June 
8 June: Bluff Cove air attacks
10 June: Skirmish at Many Branch Point
11–12 June: 
Battle of Mount Harriet
Battle of Mount Longdon
13–14 June
Battle of Wireless Ridge
Battle of Mount Tumbledown
14 June: Mario Menéndez surrendered to Major General Jeremy Moore, ending the Falklands War.

References 

 
Argentina
Argentina
1980s in Argentina
Years of the 20th century in Argentina